Gemmano is a comune (municipality) in the Province of Rimini in the Italian region Emilia-Romagna, located about  southeast of Bologna and about 15 km (9 mi) south of Rimini.
 
Gemmano borders the following municipalities: Mercatino Conca, Montescudo-Monte Colombo, Montefiore Conca, San Clemente, Sassocorvaro Auditore, Sassofeltrio.

Sights include the sanctuary of Madonna di Carbognano, built on the ancient site of a God Pan temple.

References

External links
 Official website

Cities and towns in Emilia-Romagna